The Lake Worth Open was a golf tournament on the LPGA Tour from 1957 to 1960, played at the Lake Worth Golf Course in Lake Worth, Florida.

Winners
1957 Betsy Rawls
1958 Marlene Hagge
1959 Betsy Rawls
1960 Fay Crocker

References

Former LPGA Tour events
Golf in Florida
Women's sports in Florida
Lake Worth Beach, Florida
Recurring sporting events established in 1957
Recurring sporting events disestablished in 1960
1957 establishments in Florida
1960 disestablishments in Florida